DeForest Area High School is a public high school in DeForest, Wisconsin. Part of the DeForest Area School District, the school serves students in grades 9–12. DeForest Area High School serves more than 1,000 students from the communities of DeForest, Windsor, and parts of Hampden, Leeds, Bristol, Burke, Vienna and portions of Madison and Sun Prairie. The school's colors are purple and gold.

References

External links
 
 DeForest Area High School

Public high schools in Wisconsin
Schools in Dane County, Wisconsin
Educational institutions established in 1969
1969 establishments in Wisconsin